Anthony Ike Fuller (September 4, 1958) is a retired professional basketball shooting guard who spent one season in the National Basketball Association (NBA) as a member of the Detroit Pistons (1980–81). He attended Pepperdine University, where he was drafted by the Pistons in the fifth round of the 1980 NBA draft. He was varsity basketball coach at Brophy College Preparatory in Phoenix, Arizona from 2006 to 2015.

References

External links

Stanford bio (archived from 2004)

1958 births
Living people
American men's basketball players
Anchorage Northern Knights players
Basketball coaches from Michigan
Basketball players from Detroit
College men's basketball head coaches in the United States
Colorado State Rams men's basketball coaches
Detroit Pistons draft picks
Detroit Pistons players
High school basketball coaches in the United States
Pepperdine Waves men's basketball coaches
Pepperdine Waves men's basketball players
San Diego State Aztecs men's basketball coaches
Shooting guards
Sportspeople from Detroit
Stanford Cardinal men's basketball coaches
UCLA Bruins men's basketball coaches
Utah State Aggies men's basketball coaches
Vincennes Trailblazers men's basketball players